Bhai Kot (Chak No. 03) is a village in the Pattoki Tehsil, Kasur District, Punjab, Pakistan, about  from Pattoki. 
Ch Mahor Khan Most Popular Person of this village, Ch Naved Alam Shera is Present Worker of PTI Most of the population of this village consists of Meos. Other clans include Jats, Arains, and Dogars but are in a minority. There are two primary schools in the village, one for girls and one for boys.

References

Populated places in Kasur District